Komsomolsky is a rural locality (a selo) and the administrative center of Komsomolsky Selsoviet, Pavlovsky District, Altai Krai, Russia. The population was 1,892 as of 2013. There are 18 streets.

Geography 
Komsomolsky is located 37 km east of Pavlovsk (the district's administrative centre) by road. Novye Zori is the nearest rural locality.

References 

Rural localities in Pavlovsky District, Altai Krai